Granville Down (24 May 1883 – 14 May 1970) was an Australian cricketer. He played seven first-class matches for South Australia between 1911 and 1913. He was an all-rounder for Adelaide Club in district cricket.

See also
 List of South Australian representative cricketers

References

External links
 

1883 births
1970 deaths
Australian cricketers
South Australia cricketers
People from Bathurst, New South Wales
Cricketers from New South Wales